Time: The Kalief Browder Story is a six-episode American documentary television miniseries that broadcast on Spike beginning March 1, 2017. The documentary recounts the story of Kalief Browder, a Bronx high school student who was imprisoned for three years, two of them in solitary confinement on Rikers Island, without being convicted of a crime.

He was accused at 16 of stealing a backpack, and his family was unable to afford his bail, set at $3,000.

Production
The series was directed by Jenner Furst. Jay-Z, Harvey Weinstein and David Glasser were executive producers.

Episodes
Episode 1 - The System
Episode 2 - The Island
Episode 3 - The Bing
Episode 4 - The Witness
Episode 5 - Injustice for All
Episode 6 - The After Life

Reception
Writing at Jezebel, Julianne Escobedo Shepherd described Time as "very likely one of the most devastating documents I have ever seen, and one of the most important: It seems impossible to watch this and not want to take action." At Deadline, Dominic Patten called the series "television you should take the time to watch. Even if the horrors of an innocent teenager thrown into the hell of Rikers Island and the broken criminal justice system is something...that makes you want to look away." Philadelphia Daily News critic Ellen Gray said, "I can't remember the last time anything left me as shaken as Time: The Kalief Browder Story," but "we have to be willing not to look away." Writing for Variety, Maureen Ryan said, "Though it may veer into the melodramatic at times, “Time” has an important story to tell, and is imbued with a passionate desire to present every important aspect of the injustices done to Browder — and thousands of other men and women like him. Though it uses Browder's experiences to indict a whole system, to its credit, “Time” never loses sight of the man at the center of this case, who endured a tragedy as unforgettable as it is American."

Its premiere episode earned 750,000 first-run viewers in the United States across Spike and BET.

International broadcast
The series is distributed by Netflix in all countries including the United States.

References

External links
 
 
 
 
 

2017 American television series debuts
2017 American television series endings
2010s American documentary television series
English-language television shows
Television series by Roc Nation
Television series by The Weinstein Company
Television shows set in the Bronx
Rikers Island